Playing the Field is the first greatest hits album by British pop rock band, The Outfield. Released in 1992, the album features much of the band's popular material released over the previous decade.

Track listing 
All songs written by John Spinks.
"Your Love"
"Since You've Been Gone"
"All the Love in the World"
"Say It Isn't So"
"Everytime You Cry"
"Reach Out"
"Somewhere in America"	
"Voices of Babylon"
"No Surrender"
"My Paradise"

Personnel 
Tony T Lewis - vocals, bass
John Frederick Spinks - guitar, keyboard, songwriter
Alan Jackman - drums

External links 
The Outfield's official website

The Outfield compilation albums
1992 compilation albums